Pink-e Bala (also Romanized as Pīnk-e Bālā) is a village in Sajjadrud Rural District, Bandpey-ye Sharqi District, Babol County, Mazandaran Province, Iran. At the 2006 census, its population was 267, in 70 families.

References 

Populated places in Babol County